Neoblemus is a genus of beetles in the family Carabidae, containing the following species:

 Neoblemus andrewesi Jeannel, 1923
 Neoblemus bedoci Jeannel, 1923
 Neoblemus championi Jeannel, 1923
 Neoblemus dostali Donabauer, 1995
 Neoblemus gillerforsi Jeanne, 1996
 Neoblemus glazunovi Jeannel, 1935
 Neoblemus jeannei Pupier, 2006
 Neoblemus kubani Deuve, 2006
 Neoblemus samai Magrini & Pavesi, 2003
 Neoblemus zetteli Donabauer, 1995

References

Trechinae